Lobocrypta is a genus of ctenophores belonging to the family Cryptolobatidae.

Species:
 Lobocrypta annamita Dawydoff, 1946

References

Tentaculata